Deymeskan (also Romanized as Deymeskān and Dīmeskān) is a village in Ravar Rural District, in the Central District of Ravar County, Kerman Province, Iran. At the 2006 census, its population was 180, in 56 families.

References 

Populated places in Ravar County